Esther Park, also spelt Estherpark, is a suburb of Kempton Park, in Gauteng province, South Africa. It is west of the city centre.

References

Suburbs of Kempton Park, Gauteng